Hükümet Kadın (Government Woman) is a 2013 Turkish comedy film directed by Sermiyan Midyat.

Premise
One day Midyat's mayor loses his life in a car accident. His wife Xate must do his job.

Cast
 Demet Akbağ - Xate
 Sermiyan Midyat - Faruk
 Mahir İpek - Ikram
 Gülhan Tekin - Fehime
 Burcu Gönder - Güle
 Ercan Kesal - Aziz Veysel
 Nazmi Kırık - Ferhat
 Cezmi Baskın - Eşekçi Feyzullah
 Ayberk Atilla - Şeyhmuz
 Sarp Aydınoğlu - Teacher (Ögretmen)
 Bülent Çolak - Baran
 Haki Biçici - Behçet
 Renan Bilek - Inspector (Müfettis) Tugrul
 Kemal Uçar - Commander (Komutan) Celal

References

External links 

2013 comedy films
2013 films
Turkish comedy films
2010s Turkish-language films